Aryn Glen Williams (born 28 October 1993) is an Australian professional footballer who plays as a defensive midfielder for Oakleigh Cannons.

Early life
Born in Perth, Australia, Williams is the son of a mother that originates from Mumbai, India and a father that was born in Kent, England, Williams was brought up in a footballing family. Both older brother Rhys and twin brother Ryan are professional footballers. The brothers all started their careers at ECU Joondalup before moving to England. On 4 February 2021, Williams signed for National League South side Havant & Waterlooville.

Honours
Persebaya Surabaya
 Liga 1 runner-up: 2019
 East Java Governor Cup Champion: 2020

References

External links

Aryn Williams at Footballdatabase

1993 births
Living people
Australian sportspeople of Indian descent
Australian people of English descent
Australian people of Welsh descent
Soccer players from Perth, Western Australia
Australian soccer players
Association football defenders
Perth RedStar FC players
Burnley F.C. players
Floreat Athena FC players
Perth Glory FC players
Preston Lions FC players
NEROCA FC players
Persebaya Surabaya players
Havant & Waterlooville F.C. players
Oakleigh Cannons FC players
A-League Men players
National Premier Leagues players
I-League players
Liga 1 (Indonesia) players
Australian expatriate soccer players
Australian expatriate sportspeople in England
Expatriate footballers in England
Australian expatriate sportspeople in India
Expatriate footballers in India
Australian expatriate sportspeople in Indonesia
Expatriate footballers in Indonesia